Francesco Badoer may refer to:

Francesco Badoer (1507–1564)
Francesco Badoer (1512–1572), built the Villa Badoer
Francesco Badoer (1570–1610)